The 1932 South Dakota gubernatorial election was held on November 8, 1932. Incumbent Republican Governor Warren Green ran for re-election to a second term. He defeated former Governor Carl Gunderson in the Republican primary and faced former State Representative Tom Berry, the Democratic nominee, in the general election. Aided by Democratic presidential nominee Franklin D. Roosevelt's landslide victory in South Dakota, Berry defeated Green for re-election in a landslide.

Democratic Primary

Candidates
 Tom Berry, former State Representative
 Lorenzo E. Corey, former State Senator from Charles Mix County, 1930 Democratic candidate for Governor
 Emil Loriks, State Senator from Kingsbury County (eliminated at convention)

Results

Republican Primary

Candidates
 Warren Green, incumbent Governor
 Carl Gunderson, former Governor
 Tom Ayres, perennial candidate

Results

General election

Results

References

South Dakota
1932
Gubernatorial
November 1932 events in the United States